Folio may refer to:

People
 Cynthia Folio (born 1954), American musician and composer

Printing and publishing terms
 Folio (printing), a book size, the page number of books, or sheets with multiple printed pages
 Folio (typeface)
 Foolscap folio, a paper size
 A particular edition of a book printed on folio pages, such as the First Folio of William Shakespeare's plays
 A leaf of a book: see Recto and verso

Brands and companies
 Folio Corporation, an information management software company
 Folio Society, a London membership-based publishing company
 Folio, an imprint of French publisher Éditions Gallimard
 Folio, Inc., developers of the F3 font format
 Folio, an illustration agency founded in London in 1976

Periodicals
 Folio (magazine), a literary publication
 Folio:, a trade magazine on magazines
 Folio Weekly, an alternative newspaper in Jacksonville, Florida

See also
 Fabasoft Folio Cloud, a cloud computing service
 Palm Foleo, a canceled subnotebook computer
Portfolio (disambiguation)